The 3rd Annual Premios Tu Música Urbano were held on June 23, 2022, at the José Miguel Agrelot Coliseum in San Juan, Puerto Rico, recognizing artists who "transcended and boosted the success of Latin urban music around the world". Zuleyka Rivera, Omar Chaparro and Carmen Villalobos hosted the ceremony. Karol G received the Artist of the Year award, and was also the most awarded artist of the night with nine wins.

Performances

Winners and nominees 
The nominees were announced on May 12, 2022. Winners are listed first and highlighted in bold.

References 

2022 music awards
2022 awards in the United States
2022 in Latin music